Torilis nodosa is a species of flowering plant in the family Apiaceae known by the common names knotted hedgeparsley and short sock-destroyer. It is native to parts of Europe, especially the Mediterranean Basin and it is known elsewhere, such as North America, as an introduced species and a common weed. It grows in many types of habitat, particularly disturbed areas. It is an annual herb producing a hairy stem up to half a meter in maximum height. The alternately arranged leaves are each divided into several pairs of smooth-edged lance-shaped or linear leaflets. The inflorescence is a dense compound umbel of flower clusters on very short rays, often appearing like a cluster. Each flower has five petals which are unequal in size and are white with a pinkish or reddish tinge. Each greenish or pinkish fruit is about 3 millimeters long and is coated in long prickles.

References

External links
Photo gallery

Apioideae
Flora of Malta